Francisco "Chico" Lopes Albino Muchanga (born 5 November 1991) is a Mozambican footballer who plays as a defender for TS Sporting and the Mozambique national football team.

Career

Club
In December 2019, Muchanga moved to South African club TS Sporting, signing a two-year contract. He made his league debut for the club on 25 January 2020 in a 0–0 home draw with the University of Pretoria.

International
Muchanga made his senior international debut on 23 April 2011 in a 2-0 friendly victory over Tanzania.

Career statistics

International

References

External links
Francisco Muchanga at Football Database

1991 births
Living people
Clube Ferroviário de Maputo footballers
TS Sporting F.C. players
Moçambola players
National First Division players
Mozambican footballers
Mozambique international footballers
Association football defenders
Mozambican expatriate footballers
Mozambican expatriate sportspeople in South Africa
Liga Desportiva de Maputo players
People from Beira, Mozambique
Expatriate soccer players in South Africa
2022 African Nations Championship players
Mozambique A' international footballers